Sør-Audnedal (former name: Søndre Undal or Sør-Undal) is a former municipality that was located in the old Vest-Agder county in Norway. The  municipality existed from 1845 until its dissolution in 1964. It was located in the present-day municipality of Lindesnes in Agder county. The administrative centre was the village of Vigeland where Valle Church is.

Name
The municipality was named Sør-Audnedal, which means "southern Audnedal", since it is the southern part of the old Audnedal municipality, which encompassed the Audnedalen valley. The name Audnedal is from the Audna river, which runs through the valley ("-dalr") and empties into the Snigsfjorden. The river name means "destruction". Historically, the municipality was named Sør-Undal or Søndre Undal, which uses an older version of the valley name (and an alternate way of spelling "southern").

History
The municipality of Søndre Undal was established in 1845 when the old Undal municipality was divided into Nordre Undal (population: 802) and Søndre Undal (population: 3,893). The name was later changed to Sør-Audnedal. On 1 January 1899, the western part of Sør-Audnedal (population: 1,734) was separated to become the new  municipality of Spangereid. During the 1960s, there were many municipal mergers across Norway due to the work of the Schei Committee. On 1 January 1964, Sør-Audnedal municipality (population: 2,323) was merged with the neighboring municipalities of Vigmostad (population: 589) and Spangereid (population: 899) to create the new municipality of Lindesnes.

Government
All municipalities in Norway, including Sør-Audnedal, are responsible for primary education (through 10th grade), outpatient health services, senior citizen services, unemployment and other social services, zoning, economic development, and municipal roads.  The municipality was governed by a municipal council of elected representatives, which in turn elected a mayor.

Municipal council
The municipal council  of Sør-Audnedal was made up of representatives that were elected to four year terms.  The party breakdown of the final municipal council was as follows:

See also
List of former municipalities of Norway

References

External links

Lindesnes
Former municipalities of Norway
1845 establishments in Norway
1964 disestablishments in Norway